Brahim Ferradj (born 4 September 1987) is a former footballer who played as a fullback on both sides of the pitch, or as a defensive midfielder. Born in France, he elected to represent Algeria at international level.

Club career
Ferradj played for Stade Brest in the French Ligue 2 until May 2014 when his contract with the club expired without being renewed.

International career
On 14 May 2011, Ferradj was called up to the Algerian national team for the first time for a 2012 Africa Cup of Nations qualifier against Morocco.

References

External links
 Profile at Soccerway

1987 births
Living people
Footballers from Saint-Étienne
Association football defenders
Algerian footballers
French sportspeople of Algerian descent
French footballers
AJ Auxerre players
Stade Brestois 29 players
Ligue 1 players
Ligue 2 players
Algerian expatriate footballers